The Two Seals is a 1934 German comedy film directed by Fred Sauer and starring Weiß Ferdl, Harry Gondi, and Walter Steinbeck.

The film's art direction was by Kurt Dürnhöfer and Otto Moldenhauer.

Synopsis
The unpopular ruler of a small principality has his doppelganger take over the reins of government.

Cast

References

Bibliography

External links 
 

1934 films
Films of Nazi Germany
1930s German-language films
Films directed by Fred Sauer
1934 comedy films
German comedy films
German black-and-white films
1930s German films